Ei is both a surname and a given name. Notable people with the surname include:
Ei Ei Thet (born 1992), Burmese swimmer
Ei Ei (born 1965), Burmese singer
Ei-Q (born 1973), Japanese artist
Ei Aoki (born 1965), Japanese storyboard artist
Ei Iida (born 1967), Japanese former professional tennis player
Shō Ei (1559–1588), Japanese king of the Ryukyu Kingdom
Wada Ei (1857-1929), Japanese textile worker and memoirist
Poe Ei Ei Khant (born 1993), Burmese actress and singer
Rokusuke Ei (1933–2016), Japanese lyricist, composer, author, essayist

Burmese-language surnames
Japanese unisex given names
Surnames of Burmese origin